Amit Purohit (10 February 1987 – 9 July 2019) was an  Indian film actor. He appeared in several Hindi and Telugu films. His last film was Sammohanam with Sudhir Babu and Aditi Rao Hydari. He was engaged to actress and model Supriya Keshri.

Filmography

 Shobhana 7 Nights
 Sammohanam (2018 film)
 Aalaap (film)
 Pankh (film)
 Bijuka

References

External links
 

1987 births
Indian male film actors
Male actors in Hindi cinema
Male actors in Telugu cinema
2019 deaths